Marquis is a village in the Canadian province of Saskatchewan within the Rural Municipality of Marquis No. 191 and Census Division No. 7. It is on Highway 42 about 32 km northwest of Moose Jaw.

History 
Marquis incorporated as a village on March 21, 1910.

Demographics 

Economy 
Businesses and services in the village include a general store/liquor store franchise, a post office, a municipal office, a sand blasting and painting facility, and a service station.  The primary economic base is agriculture.

Marquis is located on the Canadian Pacific Railway line.  As in many Saskatchewan communities, Marquis's grain elevators were torn down during the 1990s.

See also 

 List of communities in Saskatchewan
 Villages of Saskatchewan

References

Villages in Saskatchewan
Marquis No. 191, Saskatchewan
Division No. 7, Saskatchewan